Ashwin Sanghi (born 25 January 1969) is an Indian writer and author of the novels: The Rozabal Line, Chanakya's Chant, The Krishna Key, Sialkot Saga, Keepers Of The Kalachakra, The Vault of Vishnu and The Magicians of Mazda.

Biography 
Sanghi completed his schooling at the Cathedral & John Connon School, graduated with a BA (Economics) from St. Xavier's College, and earned an MBA from the Yale School of Management. He joined his family's business in 1993. He wrote his first novel in 2006. In 2014, Sanghi and James Patterson co-wrote a thriller titled Private India for Patterson's Private series.

Critical acclaim
Sanghi has received positive feedback from writers and the media.

Bibliography and adaptations
 The Rozabal Line: First published under the anagram Shawn Haigins.
 Chanakya's Chant: Available in 4 languages - English, Hindi, Telugu and Tamil.
 The Krishna Key: also available in English, Hindi, Telugu and Tamil.
 Private India: co-written with James Patterson, within the latter's "Private" series.
 13 Steps To Bloody Good Luck.
 Sialkot Saga.
 13 Steps To Bloody Good Wealth
 13 Steps To Bloody Good Marks
 "Private Delhi" co-written with James Patterson
  Keepers Of The Kalachakra
13 Steps to bloody Good Health
13 Steps to bloody Good Parenting
The Vault of Vishnu
The Magicians of Mazda

Awards
 The 2010 Vodafone-Crossword Popular Choice Award was awarded to Chanakya's Chant. The award is decided by readers' votes online
 Private India made it to UK Top Bestseller List.

See also
 Amish Tripathi
 Ravinder Singh
 Piyush Jha

References

External links

 Official website
 Interview on Storizen

1969 births
Living people
Indian thriller writers
Writers from Mumbai
Indian male novelists
St. Xavier's College, Mumbai alumni
Marwari people
Rajasthani people
English-language writers from India
Alternate history writers
Writers of historical mysteries
21st-century Indian novelists
Yale School of Management alumni
Cathedral and John Connon School alumni
Novelists from Maharashtra
21st-century Indian male writers